Haddix may refer to:

People
Harvey Haddix, lefthanded pitcher for Major League Baseball (MLB) 
Margaret Peterson Haddix, author
Michael Haddix, quarterback for the National Football League (NFL)
Wayne Haddix, defensive back for the National Football League (NFL)

Places
Haddix, Kentucky, unincorporated community